Asellus is a genus of isopod crustaceans in the family Asellidae.

Species

Asellus is divided into three subgenera which contain the following species:

Asellus Geoffroy, 1764
Asellus alaskensis Bowman & Holmquist, 1975
Asellus amamiensis Matsumoto, 1961
Asellus aquaticus (Linnaeus, 1758)
Asellus balcanicus Karaman, 1952
Asellus birsteini Levanidov, 1976
Asellus crypticus Collinge, 1945
Asellus epimeralis Birstein, 1947
Asellus ezoensis Matsumoto, 1962
Asellus hilgendorfii Bovallius, 1886
Asellus hyugaensis Matsumoto, 1960
Asellus incisus Van Name, 1936
Asellus kumaensis Matsumoto, 1960
Asellus latifrons Birstein, 1947
Asellus levanidovorum Henri & Magniez
Asellus meridionalis Racovitza, 1919	
Asellus monticola Birstein, 1932
Asellus musashiensis Matsumoto, 1961
Asellus primoryensis Henry & Magniez, 1993
Asellus quicki Collinge, 1947
Asellus shikokuensis Matsumoto, 1960
Asellus tamaensis Matsumoto, 1960

Asellus (Mesoasellus) Birstein, 1939
Asellus dybowskii Semenkevich, 1924

Asellus (Phreatoasellus) Matsumoto, 1962
Asellus akyioshiensis (Ueno, 1927)
Asellus higoensis Matsumoto, 1960
Asellus iriei Matsumoto, 1978 
Asellus minatoi (Matsumoto, 1978)
Asellus miurai Chappuis, 1955
Asellus uenoi (Matsumoto, 1978)
Asellus yoshinoensis Matsumoto, 1960

Notes

References

Asellota
Isopod genera